Julienne L. Baronda (born February 16, 1979) is a Filipino politician who is currently serving as congresswoman of the lone legislative district of Iloilo City since 2019.

Biography 
Baronda's public service started in 1996 when she served as the president of Sangguniang Kabataan (SK), a division of the government dedicated to the orientation of well-being for the youth, at the young age of 17. In 2019, she was elected as congresswoman of the lone legislative district of Iloilo City under the National Unity Party (NUP) banner. She also earned her master’s degree in public administration in Guimaras State University in the same year.

Baronda was a former Iloilo City Councilor and Chief Political Officer of the office of former senator JV Ejercito.

References 

1979 births
Living people
People from Iloilo City
Hiligaynon people
Visayan people
Members of the House of Representatives of the Philippines from Iloilo City
People from Guimaras
National Unity Party (Philippines) politicians
Women members of the Cabinet of the Philippines
Women members of the House of Representatives of the Philippines
21st-century Filipino women politicians
21st-century Filipino politicians